Basford Hall can refer to:

Basford Hall, a demolished manor and small settlement now called Basford, Cheshire
Basford Hall Yard, a railway yard near the location of the former Basford Hall